The Dartmouth Outing Club (DOC) is the second oldest and largest collegiate outing club in the United States.  Proposed in 1909 by Dartmouth College student Fred Harris to "stimulate interest in out-of-door winter sports", the club soon grew to encompass the college's year-round outdoor recreation and has had a major role in defining Dartmouth College.

Today the club has over 1500 student members (and almost as many non-student members) and acts as an umbrella organization for about a dozen member clubs which each specialize in an aspect of outdoor recreation.  Among them is the Dartmouth Ski Team whose members have participated in 25 Olympic Games, beginning with John B. Carleton, who as a member of the Dartmouth class of 1922 competed in Chamonix in cross country and nordic combined.

History
Fred Harris, a member of the Dartmouth College class of 1911, proposed in 1909 an outing club which would stimulate outdoor interest during the cold, winter months through skiing and snowshoeing.  The club's first "formal" meeting took place on December 14, 1909, in the South Fayerweather dormitory.  In 1910, a "Field Day" was established, which was a simple gathering time for groups to participate in outdoor activities. By 1911, the club had decided to enhance the Field Day by inviting women, holding further social festivities, and renaming it the "Winter Carnival", an event which has been carried out every year since, excepting 1918 (due to lack of coal and wood).

Outing Club membership increased steadily, until by 1920, two-thirds of the student body were members. In February of that year, Fred Harris wrote an article in National Geographic Magazine entitled "Skiing over the New Hampshire Hills" primarily about the Dartmouth Outing Club. The spring after this article was published, the number of applicants to the college increased from 825 to 2625, forcing the college to become selective in admission for the first time.

In 1929, the Club built the Dartmouth Outing Club House on Occom Pond in Hanover. 1935 saw the introduction of Freshman Trips to encourage participation in the club, a tradition which is now among the largest pre-orientation programs in the country. By 1956, the Dartmouth Skiway was built at Holt's Ledge, replacing Oak Hill as the primary downhill skiing facility for the college. That same year, President Eisenhower joined the DOC.

Mount Moosilauke and the White Mountains

The club had acquired a log cabin at the base of Mount Moosilauke by 1913, and was building another cabin nearby. Upon hearing this news, Johnny Johnson, Dartmouth class of 1866, decided to donate much of his real estate investments to the club. His donations led to a chain of cabins through the White Mountains, reaching a peak of 30 in number during the 1930s.

In 1926, the club's trail officially became a  part of the Appalachian Trail, and member clubs such as Cabin and Trail began to be formed. The same year, the DOC established the Intercollegiate Winter Sports Union. The club was soon granted the Moosilauke Summit House, which served as a hotel and received nearly 3300 guests per year.

1935 saw the fire which destroyed Moosilauke's log cabin. After further investment in surrounding lands, the Moosilauke Ravine Lodge was built in 1939 as one of the largest log buildings in New Hampshire.

See also
List of university outing clubs
Dartmouth College student groups

References

External links

Dartmouth College student organizations
Dartmouth Big Green
Appalachian Trail
University outdoors clubs